

List

LA 1 to LA 99

LA 100 to LA 199

LA 300 to LA 399

LA 400 to LA 499

LA 500 to LA 599

LA 600 to LA 699

LA 700 to LA 799

LA 800 to LA 899

LA 900 to LA 999

LA 1000 to LA 1099

LA 1100 to LA 1199

LA 1200 to LA 1299

LA 3000 to LA 3099

LA 3100 to LA 3199

LA 3200 to LA 3299

Unbuilt state highways
LA 3145: unbuilt Ivanhoe–Jeanerette highway (1970s)

See also
List of state highways in Louisiana (pre-1955)

References

Footnotes

Works cited

External links
Maps / GIS Data Homepage, Louisiana Department of Transportation and Development

 
State highways